is a freelance Japanese actor, model and singer. He has performed as Genichirou Sanada from The Prince of Tennis musicals series, Tenimyu. He was employed by Ingot Entertainment until October 31, 2019. His blood type is A.

Filmography

Theatre 
 2005 NIKE WORLD CUP Show – Tokyo Motor Show 2005 Production Booth
 Ashes and The Diamonds as Ruby
 Musical Dear Boys – VS. East Honmoku as Mamoru Fujisawa
 The Dream of Flamingo「フラミンゴの夢」
 Gyakuten Saiban - Turnabout Spotlight as Phoenix Wright

TENIMYU: THE PRINCE OF TENNIS MUSICAL SERIES (as Genichirou Sanada)
 The Prince of Tennis Musical – Absolute King Rikkai feat Rokkaku ~ First Service (Winter of 2006–2007)
 The Prince of Tennis Musical – Dream Live 4th (2007)
 The Prince of Tennis Musical – Absolute King Rikkai feat Rokkaku ~ Second Service (2007)
 The Prince of Tennis Musical – The Progressive Match Higa feat Rikkai (2007)
 The Prince of Tennis Musical – Dream Live 5th (2008)
 The Prince of Tennis Musical – Dream Live 6th (2009)
 The Prince of Tennis Musical – The Final Match Rikkai First (2009)
 The Prince of Tennis Musical – The Final Match Rikkai Second feat. Rivals (Winter to Spring of 2009–2010)
 The Prince of Tennis Musical – Dream Live 7th (2010)
 Peacemaker (2011)

 Television Kamen Rider Zi-O'' (2018–2019) – Swartz

Discography

Albums 
 Musical The Prince of Tennis Best Actor's Series 009 Kentarou Kanesaki as Genichirou Sanada and Ren Yagami as Seiichi Yukimura
Track Listings

 "Galaxy"
 "HOLIDAY"
 "Hatsukoi"
 "Instrumental – Inui vs Yanagi"
 "Makeru Koto no Yurusarenai Ouja – Hijou no Tennis"
 "Instrumental – Fuji vs Kirihara"
 "Instrumental – Ryoma vs Sanada"
 "Kimi Wo Shinjiteru"
 "Mou Mayoi wa Nai"
 "Kanesaki Kentarou & Yagami Ren Message for you"

DVD 
 2475 count -> L/OVE
 TIAN
 Natural Face vol. 01
 Natural Face vol. 04
 Natural Face vol. 06
 Natural Face vol. 08
 Talking Face (Kanesaki Kentarou x Herbie Yamaguchi) vol.6

Photobook 
 2475 count -> L/OVE
 HAI
 Kokoro x Kokoro [心x心]
 Kokoro [心]
 Ambitious vol.2

Internet 
 Amegacha
 Castella with Shiozaki IRE

Radio Show 
 Maberaji X with Shindo Gaku https://web.archive.org/web/20080615022546/http://mrw-x.jp/

External links 
 Musical DEAR BOYS
 MABERAJI X
 ~Kanesaki Kentarou Community~
 
 

1984 births
Living people
Japanese male actors
Musicians from Yamaguchi Prefecture
21st-century Japanese singers
21st-century Japanese male singers